James R. Brown (San Marcos, Texas on May 16, 1892 – January 21, 1943) was an American baseball catcher and first baseman in the Negro leagues. He played from 1920 to 1935, playing mostly with the Chicago American Giants. Brown died after being thrown out of a car, breaking his neck.

References

External links
 and Baseball-Reference Black Baseball stats and Seamheads
 

1892 births
1943 deaths
Chicago American Giants players
Louisville Black Caps players
Baseball players from Texas
Sportspeople from San Marcos, Texas
20th-century African-American sportspeople
Baseball catchers